Rothmannia macrosiphon is a species of plant in the family Rubiaceae. It is found in Kenya and Tanzania.

References

macrosiphon
Vulnerable plants
Taxonomy articles created by Polbot
Taxa named by Diane Mary Bridson
Taxa named by Adolf Engler